Onthophagus ludio, is a species of dung beetle found in India, and Sri Lanka.

Description
This broadly oval, very compact and convex species has an average length of about 6 to 9 mm. Body black and shiny. Pronotum and back of the head are metallic green or deep blue. Elytra bright yellow with black markings. Antennae and mouthparts are yellowish. Head shiny and less broad. Clypeus lightly rugose, and forehead sparsely punctured. Pronotum strongly, evenly, and fairly closely punctured. There is a blunt tubercle on each side of the middle part of the pronotum. Elytra finely striate, with flat intervals and a row of fine granules. Pygidium shiny, strongly and deeply punctured. Female has a sharp straight carina behind the eyes on head.

References 

Scarabaeinae
Insects of India
Beetles of Sri Lanka
Insects described in 1914